Krzysztof Kiersznowski (26 November 1950 – 24 October 2021) was a Polish actor. He appeared in more than 60 films and television shows from 1977 to 2021.

Selected filmography
 Vabank (1981)
 Fever (1981)
 Kiler-ów 2-óch (1999)
 The Mighty Angel (2014)

References

External links

1950 births
2021 deaths
Polish male film actors
20th-century Polish male actors
21st-century Polish male actors
Male actors from Warsaw